Jules Migeot (4 November 1898 – 18 December 1986) was a Belgian sprinter. He competed in the 400 metres at the 1920 Summer Olympics and the 1924 Summer Olympics.

References

External links
 

1898 births
1986 deaths
Athletes (track and field) at the 1920 Summer Olympics
Athletes (track and field) at the 1924 Summer Olympics
Belgian male sprinters
Belgian male hurdlers
Olympic athletes of Belgium
Place of birth missing